Cochinorchestia is a genus of amphipod belonging to the family Talitridae.

Species
 Cochinorchestia lindsayae Lowry & Springthorpe, 2015
 Cochinorchestia metcalfeae Lowry & Springthorpe, 2015
 Cochinorchestia morini (Peethambaran Asari, 1998)
 Cochinorchestia morrumbene Lowry & Springthorpe, 2015
 Cochinorchestia notabilis (K.H. Barnard, 1935)
 Cochinorchestia poka Lowry & Springthorpe, 2015
 Cochinorchestia tulear Lowry & Springthorpe, 2015

References

Amphipoda
Taxa named by James K. Lowry
Crustaceans described in 2010